Van-royena is a genus of the plant family Sapotaceae described as a genus in 1963.

There is only one known species, Van-royena castanosperma, which is endemic to the Cook region in northern Queensland.

Description
The narrow, yellowish, vertical stripes in the blaze shaded bark layer is thin, about 2-3 mm. The petioles (leaf stalks) and twigs produce a milky exudate.
The stamens are attached well below the throat of the flower tube.
The testa (seed coat) is thick, hard and woody.

Taxonomy
It has several common names including; milky plum, yellow plum, saffron boxwood and poison plum.

Under the Nature Conservation Act 1992 (NCA) of Australia, its status is least concern.

The genus name of Van-royena is in honour of Pieter van Royen (1923–2002), a Dutch botanist. He was an author of many papers on the flora of New Guinea. The Latin specific epithet of castanosperma refers to the evergreen tree of Castanospermum (in the family Fabaceae), also from Queensland.

Both the genus and the species were first described and published in Adansonia, n.s., Vol.3 on page 329 in 1963.

The genus is recognized by the United States Department of Agriculture and the Agricultural Research Service, but they do not list any known species.

References

Other sources
 Swenson, U. et al. 2007. Phylogeny, diagnostic characters, and generic limitation of Australasian Chrysophylloideae (Sapotaceae, Ericales): evidence from ITS sequence data and morphology. Cladistics 23:201-228.

Chrysophylloideae
Endemic flora of Australia
Monotypic Ericales genera
Sapotaceae genera
Plants described in 1963
Flora of Queensland
Taxa named by André Aubréville
Taxa named by Cyril Tenison White